Brezje is a settlement in Sveta Nedelja, Zagreb County, Croatia, population 1,506 (census 2011).

Glück-Hafner Manor, built between 1846 and 1851 in late baroque-historicist style, is located in Brezje.

References

Populated places in Zagreb County